Nyblom is a surname. Notable people with the name include:

Anders Nyblom (born 1981), Danish wrestler
Håkan Nyblom (born 1981),  Danish wrestler, twin brother of Anders
Helena Nyblom (1843–1926), Swedish children's writer
Olga Nyblom (1872–1955), Swedish artist